Linn Township is located in Woodford County, Illinois at T28N, R1W. As of the 2010 census, its population was 287 and it contained 117 housing units. Linn Township was formed when it separated from its original township to create two new townships, the other being Clayton Township (T28N, R1E), on an unknown date.

Geography

Demographics

References

External links
City-data.com
Illinois State Archives

Townships in Woodford County, Illinois
Peoria metropolitan area, Illinois
Townships in Illinois